In mathematics, cylindrical algebraic decomposition (CAD) is a notion, and an algorithm to compute it, that are fundamental for computer algebra and real algebraic geometry. Given a set S of polynomials in Rn, a cylindrical algebraic decomposition is a decomposition of Rn into connected semialgebraic sets called cells, on which each polynomial has constant sign, either +, − or 0. To be cylindrical, this decomposition must satisfy the following condition: If 1 ≤ k < n and π is the projection from Rn onto Rn−k consisting in removing the last k coordinates, then for every pair of cells c and d, one has either π(c) = π(d) or π(c) ∩ π(d) = ∅. This implies that the images by π of the cells define a cylindrical decomposition of Rn−k.

The notion was introduced by George E. Collins in 1975, together with an algorithm for computing it.

Collins' algorithm has a computational complexity that is double exponential in n. This is an upper bound, which is reached on most entries. There are also examples for which the minimal number of cells is doubly exponential, showing that every general algorithm for cylindrical algebraic decomposition has a double exponential complexity.

CAD provides an effective version of quantifier elimination over the reals that has a much better computational complexity than that resulting from the original proof of Tarski–Seidenberg theorem. It is efficient enough to be implemented on a computer. It is one of the most important algorithms of computational real algebraic geometry. Searching to improve Collins' algorithm, or to provide algorithms that have a better complexity for subproblems of general interest, is an active field of research.

Implementations
 Mathematica: CylindricalDecomposition
 QEPCAD -- Quantifier Elimination by Partial Cylindrical Algebraic Decomposition
 redlog
  Maple: The RegularChains Library and ProjectionCAD

References
Basu, Saugata; Pollack, Richard; Roy, Marie-Françoise Algorithms in real algebraic geometry. Second edition. Algorithms and Computation in Mathematics, 10. Springer-Verlag, Berlin, 2006. x+662 pp. ; 3-540-33098-4
Strzebonski, Adam. Cylindrical Algebraic Decomposition  from MathWorld.
Cylindrical Algebraic Decomposition in Chapter 6 ("Combinatorial Motion Planning") of Planning algorithms by Steven M. LaValle. Accessed 8 February 2023
Caviness, Bob; Johnson, Jeremy; Quantifier Elimination and Cylindrical Algebraic Decomposition. Texts and Monographs in Symbolic Computation. Springer-Verlag, Berlin, 1998.
Collins, George E.: Quantifier elimination for the elementary theory of real closed fields by cylindrical algebraic decomposition, Second GI Conf. Automata Theory and Formal Languages, Springer LNCS 33, 1975.
Davenport, James H.; Heintz, Joos: Real quantifier elimination is doubly exponential, Journal of Symbolic Computation, 1988. Volume 5, Issues 1–2, ISSN 0747-7171,

Algebra
Real algebraic geometry